Friedrich Verzetnitsch (born 22 May 1945) is a former Austrian trade unionist.

Born in Vienna, Verzetnitsch completed an apprenticeship as a pipe fitter and began working for a small business.  In 1961, he joined the Union of Metal, Mining and Energy.  He became active in the Austrian Trade Union Federation's (ÖGB) youth organisation, and from 1963 was the president of its Vienna region.  In 1970, he began working full-time for the ÖGB, and in 1983 he was appointed as general secretary of its executive.

In 1986, Verzetnitsch was elected as a Social Democratic Party of Austria member of the National Council.  In 1987, he was elected as president of the ÖGB.  From 1993 until 2003, he also served as president of the European Trade Union Confederation.

In 2000, Verzetnitsch secretly used the ÖGB's strike fund to guarantee the debts of the BAWAG bank, which the ÖGB owned.  This became public knowledge in 2006, and the resulting scandal led Verzetnitsch to resign all his positions.

References

1945 births
Living people
Austrian trade union leaders
Members of the National Council (Austria)
Social Democratic Party of Austria politicians
People from Vienna